"The Gang's All Here" is a song by American rock band Skid Row. It's the first single off of their upcoming sixth studio album of the same name and the first song to feature frontman Erik Grönwall following ZP Theart's dismissal from the band in March 2022.

Writing
The song was written by Skid Row. The lyrics makes a nod to "tricky little Vicky," who first appeared in the band's 1989 song "Rattlesnake Shake."

Recording
The song was recorded in Nashville, Tennessee and produced by Grammy Award-winning producer Nick Raskulinecz who has previously worked with the Foo Fighters, Rush, Alice In Chains, Halestorm, and Evanescence. Frontman Erik Grönwall recorded the vocals while he was still in Sweden prior to him joining the band for their tour with the Scorpions for the latter's Las Vegas residency. In an  interview, guitarist Dave Sabo shed some light on the recording process for the song, revealing that vocalist Erik Grönwall laid down the vocals for the song in 24 hours upon receiving it from the band.

Release
A snippet of the song premiered on SiriusXM's Trunk Nation With Eddie Trunk on March 23, 2022. Two days later, the song received its official premiere online.

Music video
The music video for "The Gang's All Here" was released on May 25, 2022. The clip features live footage and photos taken and submitted by fans during the band's early 2022 concerts, as well as behind-the-scene footage showing the band rehearsing in studio and backstage.

Reception
Reviews for "The Gang's All Here" have been overwhelmingly positive. Ultimate Classic Rock's Bryan Rolli described the song as "[a]n upbeat nod to [the band's] classic era". Loudwire's Joe DiVita praised Grönwall's "killer set of pipes and a ton of charisma," calling the song "a standout track" and "one that will take many fans right back to the late '80s and early '90s."

Live performance
Skid Row debuted the song live on March 26, 2022 at the Zappos Theater in Las Vegas as the group served as the opening act for the Scorpions' Sin City Nights residency, which ran until April 16, 2022.

References

External links
 Skid Row - "The Gang's All Here" (Official Audio)
 Skid Row - "The Gang's All Here" (Official Fan Video)

2022 singles
2022 songs
Skid Row (American band) songs